Steven Norman Howey (born 26 October 1971) is an English football coach, former professional footballer and sports radio presenter.

As a player, he was a centre back who notably played in the Premier League for Newcastle United, Manchester City, Leicester City and Bolton Wanderers, before winding up his career with brief stings in the MLS with New England Revolution and in the Football League with Hartlepool United. He was capped four times by England and was part of the Euro 96 squad.

Following the end of his playing days, Howey had a brief spell in charge of non-league side Crook Town before coming out of retirement to play for Bishop Auckland whilst serving as a coach. He has since worked as a sports radio presenter for Total Sport and BBC Radio Newcastle.

Club career

Newcastle United 
Howey started his career with Newcastle United signing a professional contract on 11 December 1989. At first he was playing in the striker position for the youth and reserve teams until Ossie Ardiles conceived the idea of moving him from the attack back into the defence. Howey was an important part of Kevin Keegan's First Division championship winning side in 1992/93, winning promotion to the Premier League. Once promoted, Howey continued to be a first-choice centre back but was often missing through injury. During Howey's time at Newcastle they were Premier League runner-up twice in 1995/96 and 1996/97 in addition to FA Cup runner-up in 1997/98 and 1998/99. Howey is still a very popular figure in Newcastle as part of a successful influx from Newcastle's youth academy which also included Steve Watson, Robbie Elliott and Lee Clark.

Manchester City 
In August 2000 newly promoted Man City paid Newcastle £2,000,000 for him. His debut came in a 4–0 defeat to Charlton setting the tone for a disappointing season which saw Man City relegated. Howey remained at Man City the following season as part of the team which secured an immediate return to the Premier League as First Division champions. One last season at Man City saw Howey contribute to a top half finish and comfortable survival. In his three seasons with Man City Howey scored 11 goals. A highlight of his time at Manchester City was scoring a late equaliser against rivals Manchester United at Old Trafford, in a game more remembered for the clash between Roy Keane and Alfie Haaland.

Later career 
A £200,000 move to Leicester City followed however after six months Howey moved on to Bolton. Less than five months and only three appearances later Howey was released. A short spell with New England Revolution in Major League Soccer followed before a final professional appearance with Hartlepool United brought down the curtain on his sixteen-year professional career.

International career 
Howey earned four caps for England, starting all four matches. He made his debut in the 1–0 win against Nigeria at Wembley Stadium in November 1994. He won caps in the draws with Colombia and Portugal in 1995 before making his final appearance in the 1–0 victory over Bulgaria in March 1996. Howey was called up to the England squad for Euro 96, and was an unused substitute in the first match against Switzerland, but was not fit enough to be on the team sheet for the remaining four matches. He was never called up to the full squad again.

Managerial career 
Howey had a short, unsuccessful spell as Manager of Crook Town, taking the helm in September 2006 and resigning just two months later after a poor run of results. He followed this with a spell as a Youth Team Coach at Middlesbrough before making a playing return with National League side Bishop Auckland who he also served in a coaching capacity. Steve Howey become a coach at East Durham College Football Development Centre in 2007 and become Head Coach in 2010.

Media career
Howey has worked as a presenter for Total Sport and BBC Radio Newcastle.

In 2019 and 2020, Howey featured in both seasons of ITV show Harry's Heroes, which featured former football manager Harry Redknapp attempting get a squad of former England international footballers back fit and healthy for a game against Germany legends.

Personal life 
Howey co-presented Total Sport on BBC Newcastle with Marco Gabbiadini and Simon Pryde. His brother Lee was also a footballer, principally with Newcastle's rivals Sunderland.

Honours
Newcastle United
Football League First Division: 1992–93
FA Cup runner-up: 1997–98

Manchester City
Football League First Division: 2001–02

References

External links

Steve Howey at RevolutionSoccer.net

1971 births
Living people
Footballers from Sunderland
Footballers from County Durham
English footballers
England international footballers
Association football defenders
Newcastle United F.C. players
Manchester City F.C. players
Leicester City F.C. players
Bolton Wanderers F.C. players
New England Revolution players
Hartlepool United F.C. players
English Football League players
Premier League players
Major League Soccer players
UEFA Euro 1996 players
English football managers
Crook Town A.F.C. managers
English expatriate sportspeople in the United States
Expatriate soccer players in the United States
English expatriate footballers
FA Cup Final players
Association football coaches
Middlesbrough F.C. non-playing staff